The Boeing Insitu ScanEagle is a small, long-endurance, low-altitude unmanned aerial vehicle (UAV) built by Insitu, a subsidiary of Boeing, and is used for reconnaissance.  The ScanEagle was designed by Insitu based on the Insitu SeaScan, a commercial UAV that was intended for fish-spotting. The ScanEagle continues to receive improvements through upgrades and changes.

Design and development
ScanEagle is a descendant of another Insitu UAV, the Insitu SeaScan, which was conceived of as a remote sensor for collecting weather data as well as helping commercial fishermen locate and track schools of tuna. ScanEagle emerged as the result of a strategic alliance between Boeing and Insitu. The resulting technology has been successful as a portable Unmanned Aerial System (UAS) for autonomous surveillance in the battlefield, and has been deployed since August 2004 in the Iraq War.

Block D aircraft featured a higher-resolution camera, a custom-designed Mode C transponder and a new video system. A Block D aircraft, flying at Boeing's test range in Boardman, Oregon, set a type endurance record of 22 hours, 8 minutes.

ScanEagle needs no airfield for deployment. Instead, it is launched using a pneumatic launcher, patented by Insitu, known as the "SuperWedge" launcher.  It is recovered using the "Skyhook" retrieval system, which uses a hook on the end of the wingtip to catch a rope hanging from a  pole.  This is made possible by high-quality differential GPS units mounted on the top of the pole and UAV.  The rope is attached to a shock cord to reduce stress on the airframe imposed by the abrupt stop. NavtechGPS worked with the manufacturer of the GPS receiver system to enable the system to work in different environments, expanding the capabilities of the UAS for different mission types and areas of the world. The GPS receiver system NavtechGPS designed for the ScanEagle is still in use today.

Each ScanEagle system costs US$3.2 million (2006). A complete system comprises four air vehicles or AVs, a ground control station, remote video terminal, the SuperWedge launch system and Skyhook recovery system.

Improvements

On 18 March 2008, Boeing, with ImSAR and Insitu successfully flight-tested a ScanEagle with ImSAR's NanoSAR A radar mounted aboard. It is designed to provide high quality real-time ground imaging through adverse weather conditions or other battlefield obscurants.

In 2009, Insitu announced the NightEagle, a modified ScanEagle Block E with an infrared camera for night operations.

In August 2010, Boeing announced plans to control ScanEagles from control stations on E-3A AWACS aircraft and on the V-22.

In July 2011, a team of two ScanEagles and another UAV cooperated to search and navigate a mountain area autonomously.

Insitu introduced an improved ScanEagle 2 variant in October 2014 that has a new purpose-built heavy-fuel engine for increased reliability, which increases electrical power but decreases endurance to 16 hours.  It also has a larger nose to carry day and night sensors at the same time, an increased payload, and heavier empty and max take-off weights; wingspan, service ceiling, and cruise and top speed remain the same.  Other upgrades include a fully digital video system, a better navigation system, Ethernet-based architecture and reduced Electronic Magnetic Interference (EMI), and a new ground control station while using the same launcher and skyhook recovery system.  The ScanEagle 2 was made to appeal to the growing commercial UAV market and orders will start being taken in 2015, either new built or as an upgrade for existing ScanEagle aircraft.

In 2014, Insitu began development of the Flying Launch and Recovery System (FLARES), a system designed to launch and recover the ScanEagle without the need to transport and assemble the launch catapult and recovery crane. "It consists of second, quadrotor UAV that carries the ScanEagle vertically and releases it into forward flight.  For recovery, the quadrotor hovers trailing a cable that it captures, as it would the cable from the SkyHook crane." FLARES incorporates the VTOL advantages of launch and recovery in confined areas, as well as eliminating the rail and crane equipment, with the flying efficiency of a fixed-wing body.  Demonstrations of the system took place from late 2014 to mid-2015, and low-rate production is scheduled for late 2016.

In November 2015, a Royal Australian Navy ScanEagle tested Sentient Vision Systems’s ViDAR optical detection system, turning the UAV into a broad area maritime surveillance (BAMS) asset capable of covering up to 80 times more area in a single sortie than is possible with standard cameras. The self-contained ViDAR system consists of high-resolution digital video cameras and software that analyses image feed and autonomously detects, tracks, and photographs each contact with a 180-degree pan. It can be incorporated into the ScanEagle as two fuselage slices, ahead of and behind the wing, without affecting performance.

The Scaneagle 3 is reportedly ITAR-free, meaning that it can be sold without a US Government weapons export licence.

Operational history

The ScanEagle entered service with the U.S. Navy in 2005. In addition to the United States military, the Australian Army also operates the ScanEagle UAV and the Canadian Government also leased the ScanEagle.

On 15 and 16 October 2008, the National Oceanic and Atmospheric Administration (NOAA) conducted three successful test flights of the ScanEagle, launching it from the fisheries and oceanographic research ship NOAAS Oscar Dyson (R 224) in Puget Sound, Washington, flying it remotely from the ship, and recovering it back aboard. In 2009, the NOAA oceanographic research ship NOAAS McArthur II (R 330) began operating a ScanEagle owned by the University of Alaska to monitor the distribution and population of seals in the Bering Sea.

In April 2009, a ScanEagle launched by the U.S. Navy was used during the stand-off between the U.S. Navy and a lifeboat controlled by pirates holding Captain Richard Phillips of the MV Maersk Alabama in the Indian Ocean after a failed hijack attempt.

Insitu announced that the ScanEagle had totaled 500,000 combat flight hours and over 56,000 sorties by July 2011.

In September 2011, Insitu revealed the ScanEagle had been employed by the U.S. Navy in Operation Unified Protector during the 2011 Libyan Revolution. The UAV was launched and recovered by the destroyer  to provide video imagery over three days that located "contacts of interest that no one else could find," which was relayed to the ship and then to the NATO command center by the secure video injection system.

The ScanEagle was being deployed off the  during demonstrations to assess UAV use in the Coast Guard. The aircraft was able to maintain visual surveillance of the boat until a cutter was able to interdict the vessel, marking the first time a UAV deployed from a Coast Guard cutter participated in drug interdiction. The trials in May lasted two weeks with 90 flight hours completed. The Coast Guard hopes to begin purchases of unmanned aerial systems by FY 2016, with small UAVs deployed from its National Security Cutter fleet by the following year. Long-term goals are to use unmanned systems to augment their manned fleet, while UAVs on offshore patrol cutters would replace medium endurance cutters.

On 26 July 2013, the ScanEagle became one of the first unmanned aerial vehicles to be granted certification by the Federal Aviation Administration to fly in U.S. airspace for commercial purposes. ScanEagles will be deployed to Alaska off a ship for ConocoPhillips to scout for icebergs and count whales, protecting drilling platforms and fulfilling environmental requirements. The ScanEagle can safely accomplish observation missions in hazardous Arctic locations, which is safer, cheaper, and more environmentally friendly than using manned aircraft. Commercial certification was the result of previous military certification and the Congressionally mandated opening of airspace over much of Alaska to small UAVs. Only four ScanEagles were certified with strict requirements: only one aircraft of the type is allowed airborne at any one time, they cannot fly through clouds or icing conditions, and they cannot take off or land during certain gust and wind conditions. The certifications did not mention line-of-sight control. On 12 September 2013, a ScanEagle with ConocoPhillips conducted its first flight from a research vessel and flew for 36 minutes. On its second flight, the aircraft experienced engine failure. It aborted the flight and landed in the water, as it was programmed to. A boat recovered the downed ScanEagle.

In July 2016, IHS Janes reported that Royal Navy frigates will cease operating the ScanEagle by November 2017. It will likely be replaced by an unknown UAS, chosen through the Royal Navy's Unmanned Warrior exercise in 2016.

Yemeni Air Force ordered 12 ordered ScanEagles that were never delivered due to the ongoing Yemeni Civil War.

On August 19, 2022 the U.S. announced it was giving 15 ScanEagles to Ukraine as part of a $775M military weapon aid package to assist in their war with Russia.

Iranian capture and reverse engineering claims

In December 2012, Iran stated it had captured an American ScanEagle that allegedly violated its airspace over the Persian Gulf. Iran later stated it had also captured two other ScanEagles. The U.S. Navy stated that none of its ScanEagles were missing. Photo evidence of a ScanEagle in Iran showed no U.S. military markings. In August, 2013, CBC News reported that the Canadian Navy had lost a ScanEagle drone in June 2012. The Navy denied it was obtained by Iran.  On 17 December 2012, Iran announced it was starting mass production for a copy of the ScanEagle and has put that UAV into service. Iran later released images of this production line.

In September 2013, a new UAV named Yasir was delivered to Iran's Army ground force; according to Jane's Information Group, the Yasir UAV appears to share the ScanEagle's 1.37 m length and 3.11 m wingspan, although it does have a slightly different twin tail boom and inverted-V tail plane configuration.

Variants
ScanEagle X200
A civilian-variant with a restricted category type certificate issued by the United States Federal Aviation Administration.
CU-169
Canadian military designation for the ScanEagle.
MQ-27A and MQ-27B
U.S. military designations for the ScanEagle.
ScanEagle RM1
Royal Navy designation for basic military variant.
IAIO Qods Yasir
Often shortened to "Yasir" or referred to as the "Sayed-2", unlicensed Iranian copy developed from multiple captured ScanEagles.

Operators

 Afghan National Army
 Military of the Islamic Emirate of Afghanistan

 Royal Australian Navy
Australian Army (former)

 Brazilian Navy

 Cameroonian Army

 Canadian Army

 Colombian Air Force
 Colombian Navy

 Czech Army

 Indonesian Navy – Eight on order, deliveries expected to be complete by May 2022.

 Iraqi Armed Forces

 Italian Navy

 Japan Ground Self-Defense Force

Kenya Defence Forces

 Lebanese Air Force – 6 on order, all delivered in April 2019.

Lithuanian Armed Forces

 Malaysian Armed Forces

 Royal Netherlands Army

Pakistan Navy

 Armed Forces of the Philippines

Romanian Army

Saudi Arabian Army 

 Republic of Singapore Navy

 Spanish Navy

 Tunisian Navy

 Royal Navy

 United States Air Force
 United States Marine Corps
 United States Navy
United States Coast Guard
 National Oceanic and Atmospheric Administration

Armed Forces of Ukraine

 Vietnam People's Navy – six on order as of June 2019.

Specifications

See also

References

External links

 ScanEagle product page on Insitu.com
 ScanEagle page on Boeing.com

Boeing military aircraft
Unmanned aerial vehicles of the United States
2000s United States military reconnaissance aircraft
Aircraft first flown in 2002